Saint Dymphna is the self-produced fourth studio album by American experimental music band Gang Gang Dance. Released in 2008 by The Social Registry, it would be the final album for the label, before moving on to 4AD for 2011's lauded Eye Contact.  It received positive reviews from critics.

The record would also mark the departure of founding drummer Tim DeWitt, who would be replaced by Jesse Lee for their next full-length work.

Critical reception 

Media response to Saint Dymphna was generally positive; aggregating website Metacritic reported a normalised rating of 78 out of 100 in October 2008 based on 27 critical reviews. Drowned in Sounds John Semple praised Gang Gang Dance's expansion of their sonic palette and noted that the album offers "genuine moments of hope and salvation amongst the unrest". Marc Masters of Pitchfork claimed that "the newfound clarity produces neither thinness nor tedium, but simply a direct, unadulterated power". AllMusic's Thom Jurek explained that the record is unique and the band's most fully realised project to date. These positive comments were encapsulated by Jody White of No Ripcord, who gave the album a maximum rating of ten out of ten by praising the band for a memorable album full of challenging and genre-defining sounds.

Slant Magazines M. Clark gave Saint Dymphna a rating of three-and-a-half stars out of five, one of the lowest that it received from notable publications, and commented that Gang Gang Dance's energy "often falls flat and their eclecticism is more distracting than compelling". Critic Robert Christgau described the album in an Honorable Mention review as "soundscape dance-rock more artful than arty." Maddy Costa of The Guardian also suggested that the album is eclectic, but gave it a favourable rating by concluding that it is "arranged with exquisite precision". Reed Fischer of Paste claimed that the record is "a dangerously sane blueprint for producers trying to capture what "futuristic" sounds like right now". Saint Dymphna figured highly in several end-of-year best album lists for 2008, notably, at number three by Cokemachineglow, at number five by The Wire, at number nine by Tiny Mix Tapes, and at number 13 by Drowned in Sound. It was named Best Album of 2008 by FACT.

Track listing

Release history

References

External links
Saint Dymphna critical reviews at Metacritic
End-of-year critics' lists for 2008 at Metacritic

2008 albums
Gang Gang Dance albums